Dave Cumberbatch (born 26 September 1964) is a Barbadian cricketer. He played in six first-class and four List A matches for the Barbados cricket team from 1983 to 2003.

See also
 List of Barbadian representative cricketers

References

External links
 

1964 births
Living people
Barbadian cricketers
Barbados cricketers
People from Saint Peter, Barbados